"Wonderful World" (occasionally referred to as "(What A) Wonderful World") is a song by American singer-songwriter Sam Cooke. Released on April 14, 1960, by Keen Records, it had been recorded during an impromptu session the previous year in March 1959, at Sam Cooke's last recording session at Keen. He signed with RCA Victor in 1960 and "Wonderful World," then unreleased, was issued as a single in competition. The song was mainly composed by songwriting team Lou Adler and Herb Alpert, but Cooke revised the lyrics to mention the subject of education more.

"Wonderful World" ended up doing substantially better on the charts than several of his early RCA singles, becoming his biggest hit single since "You Send Me" (1957). The song peaked at number 12 on the Billboard Hot 100 and hit number two on Billboard Hot R&B Sides chart.

Herman's Hermits charted with their recording of the song in 1965, reaching number four in the United States and number seven in the United Kingdom, respectively. A remake by Art Garfunkel with James Taylor and Paul Simon charted at number 17 in 1978. The Sam Cooke version was featured in the 1978 film Animal House and gained greater recognition in the UK upon a 1986 re-release when it peaked at number two on the UK Singles Chart, going silver (it had peaked at number 27 on the UK singles chart on first release in 1960). Its 1986 success was attributed to sound-alike versions featured in the film Witness (1985) and a Levi's 501 television commercial.

Background
Lou Adler and Herb Alpert composed the song with the theme that neither knowledge nor education can dictate feelings, but that love "could make the world a wonderful place." Adler did not take the song very seriously but Cooke appeared to be taken with it. "He’d say, ‘What about that song, you know?’ And then he'd start on it again," recalled Adler. Cooke wanted to steer the song toward the subject of schooling, revised the song and decided to cut it at a recording session on March 2, 1959, five days after completing his Billie Holiday tribute album, Tribute to the Lady. The threesome's writing credit for the song was given to the pseudonymous "Barbara Campbell." Campbell was also listed on the record labels for two other Cooke hits: "Only Sixteen" and "Everybody Loves to Cha Cha Cha."

The session's main goal was to record three songs Cooke had composed. There was no arranger or orchestra and the personnel consisted of Cooke, guitarist Cliff White, bassist Adolphus Alsbrook, teenage drummer Ronnie Selico and a quartet of singers that Cooke biographer Peter Guralnick believes may have been the Pilgrim Travelers – J.W. Alexander, Lou Rawls, and George McCurn (nicknamed Oopie).

There is no known footage of Cooke performing the song, even though, in 1986, ABKCO president Allen Klein offered a $10,000 reward for anyone obtaining such footage.

Release and reception
Cooke signed to RCA Victor in 1960 but his first two singles on the major label – "Teenage Sonata" and "You Understand Me" – failed to register on the charts. Meanwhile, John Siamas, co-founder of Keen Records, discovered the "demo" recording of "Wonderful World" among unreleased Cooke recordings. Keen released "Wonderful World" in competition with RCA's issue of "You Understand Me" in the same week. "Wonderful World" quickly became Cooke's best-performing single since his first hit "You Send Me," reaching number 12 on the Billboard Hot 100 and number two on the magazine's Hot R&B Sides chart. Billboard reviewed the single upon its release, giving it four stars and writing, "Moderate rocker gets a smooth belt from Sam Cooke in his usual, salable style."

In 2004, the song was placed 373rd in Rolling Stone magazine's 500 Greatest Songs of All Time.

Later versions

Herman's Hermits had a major hit in the mid-1960s with an uptempo version of the song (omitting one verse) which reached number four in the US and number seven in the UK. The Hermits' version was, according to singer Peter Noone and guitarist Keith Hopwood, done as a tribute to Cooke upon his death. In an interview with Hugh Brown prior to a 2020 concert in Edinburgh, Noone recalled that Jimmy Page, later founder of Led Zeppelin, played guitar on the track and was paid £12.  Cash Box described it as having "an infectious, rhythmic blues-tinged warm-hearted style."
Otis Redding recorded a version of the song on his 1965 album Otis Blue.
Johnny Nash recorded a version for his eponymous 1977 album What a Wonderful World.
In 1978, Art Garfunkel recorded the song at a slow tempo, with Paul Simon and James Taylor alternating as lead and backing vocalists.  This reached number 17 on the US Billboard Hot 100 and number 15 on the Cash Box Top 100. The Garfunkel version also became a number-one US Adult Contemporary hit for five weeks. Despite Paul Simon's presence on the recording, the song was not credited as a Simon and Garfunkel single. Instead, labels for US copies of the Columbia Records single read, "Art Garfunkel with James Taylor & Paul Simon".

The song (as credited under the alternate title, "(What A) Wonderful World") was included on later versions of Garfunkel's solo album, Watermark. It was added in place of another song ("Fingerpaint") to capitalize on the single's success.

The Garfunkel version includes a final verse not present in the original Sam Cooke recording; however, it is still credited to Adler, Alpert and Cooke. The lyrics to this new verse are as follows:

Don't know much about the middle ages, looked at the pictures then I turned the pages
Don't know nothin' 'bout no rise and fall, don't know nothin' 'bout nothin' at all
Girl it's you that I've been thinkin' of, and if I could only win your love, oh, girl
What a wonderful, wonderful world this would be
What a wonderful, wonderful, wonderful world this would be...
 
The last line repeats, and the song fades out at this point.

Don McLean recorded a version of the song for his 1986 album For the Memories.
Hong Kong singer Sandy Lam released a cover of the song in 1997.
In 1993, Japanese group Ulfuls released a cover of the song, which was later used in 1997 as ending song for the drama "Sore ga kotae da!"
Michael Bolton recorded a cover in 1999 for his second album of covers, Timeless: The Classics Vol. 2.

In popular culture
The song is used in the 1978 film Animal House in the well-known lunchroom scene where Bluto (John Belushi) gathers food in preparation for a food fight. The song was also included in the 1983 film Breathless. The original Sam Cooke version of the song comprised the title soundtrack of the 2005 film Hitch.

After a Greg Chapman cover of the song was featured prominently in the 1985 film Witness in a scene where Harrison Ford dances with Kelly McGillis, "Wonderful World" gained further exposure. Particularly in the United Kingdom, where a copy of the song, produced by Karl Jenkins and Mike Ratledge and with vocals sung by Barbadian Tony Jackson, a backing singer for Paul Young, appeared in "Bath", a well-remembered, Roger Lyons-directed 1985 advertisement for Levi's 501 jeans. As a result, the Sam Cooke version of the song became a hit in the UK, reaching No.2 and selling a certified 250,000 copies. In a 2005 poll by the UK's Channel Four the song was voted the 19th-greatest song ever to feature in a commercial.

The song is featured in the Mafia III's Official Soundtrack, published on October 7, 2016.

Charts and certifications

Weekly charts

Sam Cooke version

Herman's Hermits version

Johnny Nash version

Simon and Garfunkel with James Taylor version

Certifications

Notes

References
 
 

1959 songs
1960 singles
Sam Cooke songs
Otis Redding songs
Song recordings produced by Mickie Most
Herman's Hermits songs
Glen Campbell songs
Simon & Garfunkel songs
James Taylor songs
Richard Marx songs
Dutch Top 40 number-one singles
RPM Top Singles number-one singles
Songs written by Sam Cooke
The Flying Pickets songs
Songs written by Lou Adler
MGM Records singles
Songs about school
Keen Records singles